The 2021–22 season was Holstein Kiel's 122nd season in existence and the club's fifth consecutive season in the 2. Bundesliga, the second tier of German football. The club also participated in the DFB-Pokal.

Background

Kiel finished the 2020–21 season in 3rd place, qualifying for the promotion play-offs, but lost 5–2 to 1. FC Köln over two legs.

Friendly matches
Kiel announced pre-season friendly matches against Randers FC on 2 July, Brøndby IF on 10 July, VfL Wolfsburg on 14 July and Hallescher FC on 17 July.

Competitions

2. Bundesliga

League table

Matches

DFB-Pokal

Transfers

Transfers in

Loans in

Transfers out

Loans out

Notes

References

Holstein Kiel
Holstein Kiel seasons